The 1948–49 Iraq Football Association Cup was the first edition of what is now the Iraq FA Cup. Clubs and institute-representative teams participated in the tournament, which was won by Sharikat Naft Al-Basra, beating Al-Kuliya Al-Askariya Al-Malakiya 2–1 in Iraq's first ever national cup final, played at Al-Kashafa Stadium in Baghdad on 7 April 1949. The winning team's players and staff paraded the trophy around Basra upon returning from Baghdad three days after winning the tournament.

Background
Within the first week of the founding of the Iraq Football Association in October 1948, it was decided to hold league championships in four different regions: Baghdad, Basra, Kirkuk and Mosul (although the league in Mosul did not start until two seasons later). It was also decided to hold a 16-team national knockout cup tournament called the Iraq FA Cup between the top teams from each regional league.

At the beginning of November, it was decided to increase the number of teams participating in the cup by allowing some second-tier teams from Baghdad to compete. After the season's Iraq FA Baghdad League had to be shortened to a single round-robin format rather than a double round-robin due to rainy weather postponing a number of games, the Iraq FA Cup was opened up to all clubs from Baghdad wishing to compete in order to compensate for the reduced number of regional matches. 25 teams (including Kuliyat Al-Huqooq who were disqualified from the first round) eventually took part in the competition.

It was to be the last edition of the national knockout cup for clubs or institutions for another 26 years, with such cup tournaments being played at a regional level during that time (such as the Iraq FA Baghdad Cup), until the Iraq FA Cup returned in the 1975–76 season as a clubs-only competition.

First round
The first round was played between Baghdad-based teams, starting on 21 January and ending on 13 February.

Al-Kuliya Al-Askariya Al-Malakiya, Al-Malaki, Al-Ahli, Ittihad Muntada Al-Karkh, Al-Haras Al-Malaki and Al-Tayour Al-Zarqaa received byes to the second round, while Montakhab Al-Shorta were awarded a walkover due to their opponents Kuliyat Al-Huqooq being disqualified for not showing up for two matches in their regional league.

Second round
The second round started on 12 February and saw the entry of four Kirkuk-based teams; it ended on 24 February.

Kirkuk region

Baghdad region

Third round
The third round was held in February 1949 with three matches played in the Baghdad region.

Final phase
The quarter-final round was the first round in which teams from different regions faced each other. It included two Basra-based teams (Sharikat Naft Al-Basra and Al-Minaa) and one Mosul-based team (Adadiyat Al-Mosul).

Quarter-finals
The quarter-final matches were played between 10 March to 21 March.

Semi-finals
The semi-final matches were played on 27 March.

Final
The final was played on 7 April at Al-Kashafa Stadium in Baghdad to crown the first ever Iraq FA Cup winners. The ball used in the final was supplied by the Baghdad Sports Depot.

References

External links
 Iraqi Football Website

1949 in Iraq